"To the Virgins, to Make Much of Time" is a 1648 poem by the English Cavalier poet Robert Herrick. The poem is in the genre of carpe diem, Latin for "seize the day".

1648 text

Theme 

First published as number 208 in the verse collection Hesperides (1648), the poem extols the notion of carpe diem, a philosophy that recognizes the brevity of life and the need to live for and in the moment. The phrase originates in Horace's Ode 1.11.

See also
 1648 in poetry
 "To His Coy Mistress", a poem by Andrew Marvell on the same subject
 Lady Du Qiu

References

External links

 Full text

1648 poems
English poems